The 1996 World Junior Ice Hockey Championships (1996 WJHC) was the 20th edition of the Ice Hockey World Junior Championship, hosted in Massachusetts, United States. The tournament was won by Canada—defeating Sweden 4–1 in the gold-medal game—earning Canada their fourth straight gold medal and ninth overall, tying the Soviet team's record in both regards.

Attendance was less than spectacular for the championships in the United States. It would be the last time the US would host the tournament until 2005 in Grand Forks.

Among this edition of the tournament's future NHL stars were Milan Hejduk, Miikka Kiprusoff, Chris Drury, Marco Sturm, José Théodore, Mattias Öhlund, Daymond Langkow, Sergei Samsonov and tournament scoring leader Jarome Iginla.

This was the first World Juniors tournament to implement the two groups, round-robin/preliminaries and playoff format. It was also Slovakia's first appearance at the top level in the junior tournament.

Round robin

Group A

Group B

Relegation round

 was relegated for the 1997 World Junior Championships.

Playoffs

Quarterfinals

Semifinals

5th place game

Bronze medal game

Gold medal game

Scoring leaders

Goaltending leaders
(minimum 40% team's total ice time)

Tournament awards

All-star team

Goaltender: José Théodore
Defencemen: Nolan Baumgartner,  Mattias Öhlund
Forwards: Jarome Iginla,  Johan Davidsson,  Alexei Morozov

IIHF best player awards

Goaltender: José Théodore
Defenceman: Mattias Öhlund
Forward: Jarome Iginla

Final standings

Pool B
The second tier was held in Sosnowiec and Tychy, Poland, from December 28 to January 4.  Two groups of four played round robins, and then the top three played each of the top three teams from the other group.   All scores carried forward except the results against the lone eliminated team from each group.

Preliminary round
Group A

Group B

Final Round

 was promoted to Pool A for 1997.

Relegation Round

 was relegated to Pool C for 1997.

Pool C
Played in Jesenice, Bled, and Kranj, Slovenia, from December 30 to January 3.

Preliminary round
Group A

Group B

Placement Games
7th place: 4 - 1 
5th place: 3 - 2 
3rd place: 5 - 4 
1st Place: 6 - 5 

Pool D
Played in Tallinn, Estonia, from December 31 to January 4.

Preliminary round
Group A

Group B

Placement Games
5th place: 10 - 1 
3rd place: 5 - 4 
1st Place: 2 - 0 

 was promoted to Pool C for 1997.

References

World Junior Ice Hockey Championships
World Junior Ice Hockey Championships
World Junior Ice Hockey Championships
World Junior Ice Hockey Championships
World Junior Ice Hockey Championships
World Junior Ice Hockey Championships
Ice hockey in Massachusetts
International ice hockey competitions hosted by the United States
Sports in Amherst, Massachusetts
Sports in Marlborough, Massachusetts
Sports in Springfield, Massachusetts
Ice hockey competitions in Worcester, Massachusetts
Ice hockey competitions in Boston
World Junior Ice Hockey Championships
World Junior Ice Hockey Championships
Sport in Tychy
Sport in Oświęcim
World Junior Ice Hockey Championships
Sport in Jesenice, Jesenice
Sport in Kranj
World Junior Ice Hockey Championships
World Junior Ice Hockey Championships
World Junior Ice Hockey Championships
Sports competitions in Tallinn
1990s in Tallinn
International ice hockey competitions hosted by Estonia
World Junior Ice Hockey Championships